Faros Acropoleos was a Cypriot football club based in Akropoli, Nicosia. The team sometimes played in the Cypriot Third Division. The team has since been dissolved. Between 2004 and 2006 Faros had a futsal team, winning the Cypriot Futsal Third Division 2004-2005.

References

Defunct football clubs in Cyprus
1961 establishments in Cyprus
Futsal clubs established in 2004
Futsal clubs in Cyprus